Recioto di Soave DOCG is an Italian wine DOCG subregion of the Soave DOC. It was granted DOCG status in 1998. Recioto di Soave DOCG is made in the  recioto method from grapes which have been dried out, traditionally  on straw mats,  for several weeks or months after harvest. A sweet wine, Recioto di Soave must be made of at least 70% Garganega grapes, and no more than 30% Trebbiano di Soave grapes allowed per DOCG regulations.

See also

List of Italian DOCG wines
Straw wine

References

External links
 Consorzio Tutela Vini Soave e Recioto di Soave

Wines of Veneto
Italian DOCG